Olympic Athletes from Russia (OAR) was the International Olympic Committee's (IOC) designation of select Russian athletes permitted to participate in the 2018 Winter Olympics in Pyeongchang, South Korea. The designation was instigated following the suspension of the Russian Olympic Committee after the Russian doping scandal. This was the second time that Russian athletes had participated under the neutral Olympic flag, the first being in the Unified Team of 1992.

During the 2018 Winter Olympics, two athletes from this team tested positive for banned substances and were found guilty of doping by the Court of Arbitration for Sport (CAS). Both were sanctioned by the IOC and their results were annulled as a consequence of the ruling.

Background

Russian doping allegations

In December 2014, German public broadcaster ARD aired a documentary which made wide-ranging allegations that Russia organized a state-run doping program which supplied their athletes with performance-enhancing drugs. In November 2015, the World Anti-Doping Agency (WADA) published a report and the International Association of Athletics Federations (IAAF) suspended Russia indefinitely from world track and field events.

In May 2016, The New York Times published allegations by the former director of Russia's anti-doping laboratory, Dr. Grigory Rodchenkov, that a conspiracy of corrupt anti-doping officials, Federal Security Service (FSB) intelligence agents, and compliant Russian athletes used banned substances to gain an unfair advantage during the Games. Rodchenkov stated that the FSB tampered with over 100 urine samples as part of a cover-up, and that a third of the Russian medals won at Sochi were the result of doping. On 18 July 2016, an independent investigation commissioned by WADA concluded that it was shown "beyond a reasonable doubt" that the RUSADA, the Ministry of Sport, the FSB and the Centre of Sports Preparation of the National Teams of Russia had "operated for the protection of doped Russian athletes" within a "state-directed failsafe system" using "the disappearing positive [test] methodology". According to the McLaren Report, the Disappearing Positive Methodology operated from "at least late 2011 to August 2015". It was used on 643 positive samples, a number that the authors consider "only a minimum" due to limited access to Russian records.

On 9 December 2016, Canadian lawyer Richard McLaren published the second part of his independent report. The investigation found that from 2011 to 2015, more than 1,000 Russian competitors in various sports (including summer, winter, and Paralympic sports) benefited from the cover-up. Following the release of the McLaren report, the IOC announced the initiation of an investigation of 28 Russian athletes at the Sochi Olympic Games. La Gazzetta dello Sport reported the names of 17 athletes, of whom 15 are among the 28 under investigation. As of late December 2017, 13 medals had been stripped and 43 Russian athletes had been disqualified for competition in 2018. The number of athletes under investigation rose to 36 (and eventually 46) in December.

Russia has denied the existence of a doping program with the President of Russia, Vladimir Putin, blaming the United States for "using the Olympics to meddle in the [2018] Russian presidential election", that he would later win.

Official sanctions

On 5 December 2017, the IOC announced that the Russian Olympic Committee had been suspended from the 2018 Winter Olympics with immediate effect. Athletes who had no previous drug violations and a consistent history of drug testing were to be allowed to compete under the Olympic Flag as an "Olympic Athlete from Russia" (OAR). Under the terms of the decree, Russian government officials were barred from the Games, and neither the country's flag nor anthem would be present (the Olympic Flag and Olympic Anthem would be used instead). On 20 December 2017 the IOC proposed an alternative logo for the OAR athletes' uniforms (shown on right). IOC President Thomas Bach said that "after following due process [the IOC] has issued proportional sanctions for this systematic manipulation while protecting the clean athletes".

As of January 2018, the IOC had sanctioned 43 Russian athletes from the 2014 Winter Olympics and banned them from competing in the 2018 edition and all other future Olympic Games as part of the Oswald Commission. All but one of these athletes appealed against their bans to CAS. The court overturned the sanctions on 28 athletes, meaning that their Sochi medals and results were reinstated, but decided that there was sufficient evidence against eleven of the athletes to uphold their Sochi sanctions. The IOC said in a statement that "the result of the CAS decision does not mean that athletes from the group of 28 will be invited to the Games. Not being sanctioned does not automatically confer the privilege of an invitation" and that "this [case] may have a serious impact on the future fight against doping". The IOC were careful to note that the CAS Secretary General "insisted that the CAS decision does not mean that these 28 athletes are innocent" and that they would consider an appeal against the court's decision. The court also decided that none of the 39 athletes should be banned from all future Olympic Games, but only the 2018 Games. Three of the 42 Russian athletes that originally appealed are still waiting for their hearing, which will be conducted after the 2018 Games.

An original pool of 500 Russian athletes was put forward for consideration for the 2018 Games and 111 were immediately removed from consideration. The remaining athletes had to meet pre-games conditions such as further pre-games tests and reanalysis from stored samples. Only if these requirements were met would the athletes be considered for invitation to the Games. None of the athletes who had been sanctioned by the Oswald Commission were still in the pool at this stage.
The final number of neutral Russian athletes invited to compete was 169 and, after speed skater Olga Graf dropped out, the eventual total was 168.

Reaction in Russia

In the past, the Russian president Vladimir Putin and other officials had stated that it would be an embarrassment for Russia if its athletes were not allowed to compete under the Russian flag. However, his spokesman later revealed that no boycott had actually been discussed prior to the IOC's decision. After the announcement, Ramzan Kadyrov, the head of Chechnya, announced that none of the Chechen athletes would be permitted to participate under a neutral flag.

On 6 December, Putin stated that his government were prepared to allow Russian athletes to compete at the Games as individuals, but there were still calls from other Russian politicians for a boycott. Gennady Zyuganov, leader of the Communist Party of the Russian Federation, proposed to send fans to the Games with a Soviet Victory Banner. Sergey Lavrov, the Russian Minister of Foreign Affairs, suggested that the United States "fears honest competition"; while Vladimir Putin was of the opinion that the United States had used its influence within the IOC to "orchestrate the doping scandal". He called the IOC decision an unfair "collective punishment", saying "It all looks like an absolutely orchestrated and politically motivated decision. For me, there are no doubts about this."

The popular Russian newspaper Komsomolskaya Pravda reported that 86% of Russians opposed participating in the Olympics under a neutral flag, and many Russian fans attended the Games wearing the Russian colours and chanting "Russia!" in unison, in an act of defiance against the ban. After the games, Russian figure skater Evgenia Medvedeva revealed in an Instagram post that the Russian tricolor was hidden on the OAR medal ceremony uniforms underneath a white fur scarf buttoned on the front of the jacket.

Criticism
The International Ice Hockey Federation voiced support for allowing the full participation of "all clean Russian athletes" in the 2018 Winter Games, calling on the IOC to refrain from imposing "collective punishment".

The IOC's decision was heavily criticized by Jack Robertson, who was primary investigator of the Russian doping program on behalf of WADA. Robertson argued that the IOC had issued "a non-punitive punishment meant to save face while protecting the [IOC's] and Russia's commercial and political interests". He also highlighted the fact that Russian whistleblowers proved beyond doubt that "99 percent of [their] national-level teammates were doping". According to Robertson, "[WADA] has discovered that when a Russian athlete [reaches] the national level, he or she [has] no choice in the matter: [it is] either dope, or you're done". He added "There is currently no intelligence I have seen or heard about that indicates the state-sponsored doping program has ceased." It was also reported that Russian officials intensively lobbied US politicians in an apparent attempt to secure Dr. Grigory Rodchenkov's extradition to Russia (Rodchenkov being the main whistleblower).

The CAS decision to overturn the life bans of 28 Russian athletes and restore their medals was fiercely criticised by Olympic officials, including IOC president Thomas Bach who said the decision was "extremely disappointing and surprising". Whistleblower Rodchenkov's lawyer stated that "the CAS decision would allow doped athletes to escape without punishment", also that "[the CAS decision] provides yet another ill-gotten gain for the corrupt Russian doping system generally, and Putin specifically".

Failed doping tests
Curler Alexander Krushelnitskiy failed his doping test after winning bronze in the mixed doubles curling as he tested positive for meldonium. This is a drug used for treating heart conditions such as angina, chronic heart failure, cardiomyopathy and other cardiovascular disorders. It has the effect of increasing blood flow and can lead to an improvement in endurance. Meldonium was placed on WADA's list of substances banned from use by athletes two years previously. He later received a four-year suspension. Norway was subsequently awarded the bronze medal for the mixed doubles curling event.

Nadezhda Sergeeva, a bobsleigh pilot, tested positive for trimetazidine, which is also included in WADA's list of banned substances. She placed 12th in the women's competition.

Medalists

Competitors
The following is the list of number of competitors that could participate at the Games per sport/discipline.

Alpine skiing 

Russia has qualified three male and two female skiers.

Mixed

Biathlon 

Based on their Nations Cup rankings in the 2016–17 Biathlon World Cup, Russia has qualified 6 men and 5 women. However, the IOC only invited 2 men and 2 women.

Bobsleigh 

Based on their rankings in the 2017–18 Bobsleigh World Cup, Russia has qualified 6 sleds.

Men

Women

* – Denotes the driver of each sled

Cross-country skiing 

Russia qualified 12 athletes,  seven male and five female.

Distance
Men

Women

Sprint
Men

Women

Curling 

Summary

Women's

Russia has qualified their women's team (five athletes), by finishing in the top seven teams in Olympic Qualification points. The representatives were determined at the 2017 Russian Olympic Curling Trials.

The Russian team consists of Victoria Moiseeva, Uliana Vasilyeva, Galina Arsenkina, Julia Guzieva, and Yulia Portunova.

Round-robin
The Olympic Athletes from Russia team has a bye in draws 3, 7 and 10.

Draw 1
Wednesday, 14 February, 14:05

Draw 2
Thursday, 15 February, 09:05

Draw 4
Friday, 16 February, 14:05

Draw 5
Saturday, 17 February, 09:05

Draw 6
Saturday, 17 February, 20:05

Draw 8
Monday, 19 February, 09:05

Draw 9
Monday, 19 February, 20:05

Draw 11
Wednesday, 21 February, 09:05

Draw 12
Wednesday, 21 February, 20:05

Mixed doubles

Russia has qualified a mixed doubles team by earning enough points in the last two World Mixed Doubles Curling Championships.

There were no trials as the team was chosen by the Russian Olympic Committee.

The Olympic Athletes from Russia team won the mixed doubles bronze medal game against Norway, but due to a positive testing of meldonium from Alexander Krushelnitskiy, their bronze medals were stripped and given to Norway.

Draw 1
Thursday, February 8, 9:05

Draw 2
Thursday, February 8, 20:04

Draw 3
Friday, February 9, 8:35

Draw 4
Friday, February 9, 13:35

Draw 5
Saturday, February 10, 9:05

Draw 6
Saturday, February 10, 20:04

Draw 7
Sunday, February 11, 9:05

Semifinal
Monday, February 12, 20:05

Bronze Medal Game
Tuesday, February 13, 9:05

Figure skating

Russia qualified 15 figure skaters (7 male, 8 female), based on its placement at the 2017 World Figure Skating Championships in Helsinki, Finland.

Individual

Mixed

Team event

Freestyle skiing 

Aerials

Halfpipe

Moguls

Ski cross

Qualification legend: FA – Qualify to medal round; FB – Qualify to consolation round

Slopestyle

Ice hockey 

Summary

Men's tournament

Russia men's national ice hockey team qualified by finishing second in the 2015 IIHF World Ranking.

In the first Olympics since 1994 that did not feature any active NHL players, the Olympic Athletes from Russia (OAR) team, consisting primarily of SKA and CSKA players of a Russia-based KHL and featuring ex-NHL all-stars Pavel Datsyuk, Ilya Kovalchuk and Vyacheslav Voynov (all SKA), won the gold medal, after a 4–3 overtime victory over the German team in the final. In its post-Olympics World Ranking, the IIHF counted this as a result for the Russian team. The IIHF considers this victory to be Russia's second gold medal in the Olympics, as they also attributed the 1992 Unified Team gold medal to Russia. However, the IOC attributes neither  of those results to Russia.

After they return to Moscow, the entire Russian gold medal-winning team and other Olympic medalists participated in a Vladimir Putin's presidential rally, where they sang the Russian anthem.

Team roster

Preliminary round

Quarterfinal

Semifinal

Final

Women's tournament

Russia women's national ice hockey team qualified by finishing 4th in the 2016 IIHF World Ranking.

Team roster

Preliminary round

Quarterfinal

Semifinal

Bronze medal game

Luge 

Based on the results from the World Cups during the 2017–18 Luge World Cup season, Russia qualified 8 sleds (10 athletes). However, only 8 athletes (7 men and 1 woman) are set to join the pool of Olympic Athletes from Russia (OAR) after the accreditation commission of the International Olympic Committee (IOC).

Men

Women

Mixed team relay

Nordic combined

Short track speed skating

According to the ISU Special Olympic Qualification Rankings, Russia has qualified 5 men and 5 women. However, only 7 athletes (3 men and 4 women) received an invitation from the IOC.

Men

Women

Qualification legend: ADV – Advanced due to being impeded by another skater; FA – Qualify to medal round; FB – Qualify to consolation round; AA – Advance to medal round due to being impeded by another skater

Skeleton 

Based on the world rankings, Russia qualified 5 sleds. However, only 2 athletes (2 men) received an invitation from the IOC.  Nikita Tregubov, who had previously represented Russia at the Sochi 2014 Olympic Games, secured a silver medal in the event.

Ski jumping 

Men

Women

Snowboarding 

Freestyle

Parallel

Snowboard cross

Qualification legend: FA – Qualify to medal round; FB – Qualify to consolation round

Speed skating 

Russia earned the following quotas at the conclusion of the four World Cup's used for qualification.

See also 
 Neutral Paralympic Athletes at the 2018 Winter Paralympics
 Russia at the 2018 Summer Youth Olympics

References

External links 

O
Winter Olympics
Doping in Russia
Olympic Games controversies
2017 controversies
2018 controversies
2018
2018 Russia
2018
Sanctions against Russia